Bekzat Osmonaliev is a Kyrgyzstani weightlifter. He competed at the 2012 Summer Olympics in the Men's 56 kg.

Major results

References

External links
 

Kyrgyzstani male weightlifters
Living people
Olympic weightlifters of Kyrgyzstan
Weightlifters at the 2012 Summer Olympics
Weightlifters at the 2006 Asian Games
Weightlifters at the 2010 Asian Games
Weightlifters at the 2014 Asian Games
1985 births
People from Jalal-Abad Region
Asian Games competitors for Kyrgyzstan
20th-century Kyrgyzstani people
21st-century Kyrgyzstani people